Events in the year 1888 in Iceland.

Incumbents 

 Monarch: Christian IX
 Minister for Iceland: Johannes Nellemann

Events 

 Strandarkirkja was constructed.

Births 

 20 September – Ríkarður Jónsson, sculptor
 8 June – Guðmundur Kamban, playwright

Deaths 

 4 September – Jón Árnason, author

References 

 
1880s in Iceland
Years of the 19th century in Iceland
Iceland
Iceland